Nuh is a masculine given name. It is the Arabic form of Noah.

Notable people with this name
 Nuh (prophet), a prophet in the Qur'an, also known as Noah
 Nuh I (died 954), amir of the Samanids
 Nuh II (died 997), amir of the Samanids
 Nuh Ha Mim Keller (born 1954), American Muslim translator of Islamic books
 Nuh ibn Asad (died circa 841), Samanid ruler of Samarkand

See also
 Mohammad Nuh (born 1959), Indonesian government official
Nuh (disambiguation)

Arabic masculine given names